Defending champion Alfie Hewett defeated Stéphane Houdet in the final, 7–6(11–9), 7–6(7–5) to win the men's singles wheelchair tennis title at the 2019 US Open. It was his second US Open singles title and third major singles title overall.

Gustavo Fernández was attempting to complete the Grand Slam, but was defeated by Houdet in the semifinals.

Seeds

Draw

Bracket

External links 

 Draw

Wheelchair Men's Singles
U.S. Open, 2019 Men's Singles